Rosa stylosa, the short-styled field rose, is a species of flowering plant in the family Rosaceae, native to western and southern Europe, and northwestern Africa. It has gone extinct in Hungary. It is not readily available from commercial suppliers.

References

stylosa
Flora of Ireland 
Flora of Great Britain
Flora of Belgium
Flora of Germany
Flora of Switzerland
Flora of Austria
Flora of Portugal
Flora of Spain
Flora of France
Flora of Italy
Flora of Greece
Flora of Morocco
Flora of Algeria
Flora of Tunisia
Plants described in 1809